The 1964 Wisconsin Badgers football team represented the University of Wisconsin in the 1964 Big Ten Conference football season.

Schedule

Personnel

Team players in the 1965 NFL Draft

Team players in the 1965 AFL Draft

References

Wisconsin
Wisconsin Badgers football seasons
Wisconsin Badgers football